Aaron Chalmers may refer to:
 Aaron Chalmers (footballer)
 Aaron Chalmers (television personality)